Periphery or peripheral may refer to:

Music 
Periphery (band), American progressive metal band
Periphery (album), released in 2010 by Periphery
 "Periphery", a song from Fiona Apple's album The Idler Wheel...

Gaming and entertainment 
Periphery, a group of political entities in BattleTech, a wargaming franchise
The Peripheral, a 2014 novel by William Gibson
The Peripheral, a streaming series based on Gibson's novel

Tech and math 

 Peripheral, an external device attached to a computer
 Peripheral, an alternate mathematical term for boundary parallel in manifold theory
Peripheral cycle, a mathematical term in graph theory

Political 
Periphery countries, the least developed countries in world systems theory
Periphery (France), statistical area designating a commuter belt around an urban unit
 Peripheries of Greece or administrative regions of Greece (Greek:), the country's first-level administrative divisions
 Peripheral units of Greece or regional units of Greece (Greek:), second-level administrative divisions

Biology 
 Periphery, all of the body outside of the central nervous system
Peripherally selective drug, a drug with a primary mechanism of action outside of the central nervous system
 Peripheral nervous system, the part of the nervous system outside of the central nervous system
Peripheral vision, a part of the vision that occurs on the edges of the field of vision

See also 
 Peripheral unit (disambiguation)